The 2013–14 Cincinnati Saints season was the first season in the Professional Arena Soccer League (PASL) for the Cincinnati Saints professional indoor soccer club. The Saints, an Eastern Division team, played their home games at the Tri-County Soccerplex in Cincinnati, Ohio. The team was led by general manager Mackenzie Long and interim head coach Chris Morman with assistant coach Kyle Kammer. Matt Brienes was the head coach for the first 9 games of the season before being replaced by Morman. The team finished with a 5–11 record, qualified for the playoffs, and were eliminated in the Eastern Division Semifinal.

Season summary
The Saints began their inaugural pro season with a win over the Cleveland Freeze but over the next 8 games managed only 2 wins, both over the struggling Illinois Piasa. On January 8, team president David Satterwhite announced that head coach Matt Breines "simply wasn't the right fit" for the organization and that he would be replaced by interim head coach Chris Morman for the remainder of the season. The team finished the regular season with a 5–11 record but secured the third spot in the Eastern Division playoffs. They fell to the Cleveland Freeze in the Eastern Division Semifinal.

The Cincinnati Saints participated in the 2013–14 United States Open Cup for Arena Soccer starting with a bye in the Round of 32 and a 10–6 loss to the Cleveland Freeze in the Round of 16, ending their tournament run.

History
The Saints had been a member of the affiliated amateur Premier Arena Soccer League since 2009 before moving up to the pro league in 2013. Starting in May 2014, the Saints organization will also play outdoor soccer during the PASL offseason as an expansion team in the Great Lakes Conference of the National Premier Soccer League.

Schedule

Regular season

† Game also counts for US Open Cup, as listed in chart below.
♥ Postponed from January 5 due to extreme winter weather

Post-season

U.S. Open Cup for Arena Soccer

References

External links
Cincinnati Saints official website

Dayton Dynamo (2016–)
Cincinnati Saints
Cincinnati Saints 2013
Cincinnati Saints 2013
Cincinnati Saints 2013